Wang Jiaocheng (born 1952) is a retired general of the Chinese People's Liberation Army Ground Force. He served as the inaugural Commander of the Southern Theater Command from 2016 to 2017. Prior to that he was the Commander of the Shenyang Military Region between 2012 and 2016, and Deputy Commander of the Nanjing Military Region from 2007 to 2012.

Biography
Wang Jiaocheng was born in 1952 in Hangzhou, Zhejiang Province, of Lai'an, Anhui ancestry. He graduated from Zhejiang University High School, and joined the PLA in 1969. He served as Deputy Chief of Staff of the Nanjing Military Region from 2000 to 2005, Commander of the 12th Group Army from 2005 to 2007, and Deputy Commander of the Nanjing MR from 2007 to 2012. He became Commander of the Shenyang Military Region in 2012.

He attained the rank of major general in July 2000, lieutenant general (zhong jiang) in July 2009, and full general in July 2014.

On February 1, 2016, Wang was named commander of the re-organized Southern Theater Command.

Wang was a full member of the 18th Central Committee of the Chinese Communist Party.

References 

1952 births
Living people
People's Liberation Army generals from Zhejiang
Politicians from Hangzhou
Members of the 18th Central Committee of the Chinese Communist Party
Deputy commanders of the Nanjing Military Region
Deputy Chiefs of Staff of the Nanjing Military Region
Commanders of Southern Theater Command
Chinese Communist Party politicians from Zhejiang
People's Republic of China politicians from Zhejiang